, also known as , is a Japanese police procedural television series starring Kentaro Sakaguchi, Michiko Kichise and Kazuki Kitamura. It is a remake of the South Korean drama of the same name written by Kim Eun-hee, and aired every Tuesday at 21:00 JST from April 10 to June 12, 2018 on Fuji TV.

A sequel film, Signal the Movie, was released in theaters in Japan on April 2, 2021.

Cast

Main
Kentaro Sakaguchi as Kento Saegusa
Michiko Kichise as Misaki Sakurai
Kazuki Kitamura as Takeshi Ooyama

Supporting

Atsuro Watabe as Tsutomu Yamada
Yuichi Kimura as Tsutomu Yamada
Tetsuhiro Ikeda as Shinya Kojima
Masahiro Komoto as Kazuo Iwata
Kaede Aono as Rika Anzai
Fuju Kamio as Ryota Kato
Yuito Obara as Yōichi Ogawa

Original soundtrack
Boy group BTS from South Korea sang the opening theme song of the series entitled "Don't Leave Me".

Ratings

International broadcast

Film

A sequel film, simply titled Signal the Movie, was released in Japan on April 2, 2021. The film was directed by Hajime Hashimoto, co-written by Kōsuke Nishi and Hiroshi Hayashi, and distributed by Toho, with cast members from the television series reprising their respective roles.

Notes

References

External links
 
 

2018 Japanese television series debuts
Japanese-language television shows
Japanese crime television series
Japanese fantasy television series
Japanese police procedural television series
Television series about multiple time paths
Japanese time travel television series
Fuji TV dramas
Japanese television series based on South Korean television series